Porcellio parenzani is a species of woodlouse in the genus Porcellio belonging to the family Porcellionidae that can be found in Albania.

References

Crustaceans described in 1931
Endemic fauna of Albania
Porcellionidae
Woodlice of Europe